Helmut Höflehner (born 24 November 1959) is a former Austrian alpine skier.

Career
In his career he has participated in two editions of the Olympic Games and three of the world championships.

Achievements
1984 Winter Olympics in Sarajevo:
fifth place at alpine skiing downhill

1984 Austrian Alpine Ski Championships:
 first place at alpine skiing downhill

1992 Winter Olympics in Albertville:
17th place at alpine skiing downhill

Alpine skiing World Championship 1985 in Bormio:
 seventh place at downhill

Alpine skiing World Championship 1987 in Crans-Montana:
 14th place at downhill

Alpine skiing World Championship 1989 in Vail:
 seventh place at downhill

10 World Cup race victories at downhill 
Two time Downhill World Cup winner 1984/85 and 1989/90

References

External links
 
 

1959 births
Living people
Austrian male alpine skiers
Olympic alpine skiers of Austria
Alpine skiers at the 1984 Winter Olympics
Alpine skiers at the 1992 Winter Olympics
FIS Alpine Ski World Cup champions
20th-century Austrian people